Notagonum luzonense is a species of ground beetle in the subfamily Platyninae. It was described by Jedlicka in 1935.

References

Notagonum
Beetles described in 1935